KSMX may refer to:

 KSMX-FM, a radio station (107.5 FM) licensed to serve Clovis, New Mexico, United States
 KSMA (AM), a radio station (1240 AM) licensed to serve Santa Maria, California, United States, which held the call sign KSMX from 2007 to 2016
 Santa Maria Public Airport in Santa Maria, California, United States